Taʾrīkh is an Arabic word meaning "date, chronology, era", whence by extension "annals, history, historiography". It is also used in Persian, Urdu, Bengali and the Turkic languages. It is found in the title of many historical works. Prior to the 19th century, the word referred strictly to writing of or knowledge about history, but in modern Arabic it is, like the English word "history", equivocal and may refer either to past events themselves or their representations.

The word taʾrīkh is not of Arabic origin and this was recognized by Arabic philologists already in the Middle Ages. The derivation they proposed—that the participle muʾarrakh, "dated", comes from the Persian māh-rōz, "month-day"—is incorrect. Modern lexicographers have proposed an unattested Old South Arabian etymon for the plural tawārīkh, "datings", from the Semitic root for "moon, month". The Ge'ez term tārīk, "era, history, chronicle", has occasionally  been proposed as the root of the Arabic term, but in fact is derived from it.

The word first appears in the titles of certain 8th-century works and by the 9th century it was the standard word of the genre of these works. The word akhbār, "reports, narratives", is a synonym and was also used in the titles of works. It may even be an older word than taʾrīkh. The word taʾrīkh was never universal in the titles of works of history, which were just as often identified by subject matter (i.e., biography, conquests, etc.) as by genre. As its etymology implies, taʾrīkh originally described only a strictly chronological account, but it soon came to refer to any kind of history (e.g. historical dictionaries).

List of works
The following are the names of prominent books with taʾrīkh in the title, in Arabic, Persian or Turkish. (The list is alphabetized, ignoring particles "-i", "al-", etc.)

Tarikh Abul Fida
Tarikh Ahlul Hadith
Tārīkh-i amniyya, a history of the Dungan Revolt, the magnum opus of Musa Sayrami
Tarikh ibn al-Athir
Tarikh Baghdad
Tarikh al-fattash
Tarikh-i Hind Wa Sind
Tarikh al-Islam al-kabir
Tarikh ibn Kathir
Tarikh al-Khulafa
Tarikh al-Rusul wa al-Muluk
al-Taʾrīkh al-sharqī
Tarikh-i Sistan
Tarikh al-Sudan
Tarikh al-Tabari
Al-Kamil fi al-Tarikh
Tarikh-e Jevdet

See also
 
 List of Muslim historians

References

Islamic terminology
Historiography
Literary genres
Bengali words and phrases
Arabic words and phrases
Persian words and phrases